The list of Elliott School of International Affairs people includes notable graduates, professors, and administrators affiliated with the Elliott School of International Affairs of the George Washington University, located in Washington, D.C.

Among its alumni count numerous ambassadors, diplomats, politicians, and public figures, including Chang Dae-whan (former Prime Minister of South Korea), Tammy Duckworth (sitting U.S. Senator), Rose Gottemoeller (current Deputy-General of NATO), Ciarán Devane (current Chief Executive of the British Council), and John Shalikashvili (former Supreme Allied Commander). Notable faculty has included  Christopher A. Kojm, chairman of the National Intelligence Council under President Obama, Moudud Ahmed, former Prime Minister of Bangladesh, Amitai Etzioni, former president of the American Sociological Association, William J. Crowe, former Chairman of the Joint Chiefs of Staff, and S. M. Krishna, Foreign Minister of India, among numerous others.

Alumni

Journalism
 Adam Ciralsky- Emmy Award and Peabody Award-winning journalist of 60 Minutes and NBC News
 Kasie Hunt (BA '06) – MSNBC and NBC News correspondent
 Diana B. Henriques (BA '69) – Pulitzer Prize finalist and New York Times journalist
Matt Medved – Spin editor-in-chief
Josh Rogin – CNN political analyst, Bloomberg View foreign policy analyst
 Kim A. Snyder (BA 83) – Variety Magazine contributor, director of Sundance Film Festival-nominated documentary I Remember Me

Diplomacy
 Michael Punke – U.S. Ambassador to the World Trade Organization
 Kurt Volker (MA '87) – U.S. Ambassador to NATO
 Joseph Prueher (MA '69) U.S. Ambassador to China
 Edward "Skip" Gnehm – U.S. Ambassador to Jordan, Kuwait and Australia
 Richard L. Baltimore – U.S. Ambassador to Oman
 Lyle Franklin Lane – U.S. Ambassador to Uruguay and Paraguay
 Robert P. Jackson – U.S. Ambassador to Ghana and Cameroon
 David H. Shinn (MA '64) – U.S. Ambassador to Ethiopia and Burkina Faso
 Francis Terry McNamara (MA '72) – U.S. Ambassador  to Gabon and São Tomé and Príncipe
 Marisa Lino (MA '72) – U.S. Ambassador to Albania
 Cresencio S. Arcos Jr. – U.S. Ambassador to Honduras
 Elliott Charng – Taiwanese Ambassador to Australia, New Zealand, and India

Law
 Andrew P. Bakaj (BA '03) – Former Department of Defense and CIA Official; lead counsel for the Whisteblower during the Impeachment Inquiry and the subsequent Impeachment of President Donald Trump.
 Miguel Méndez (AB '62) – Stanford Law School legal scholar, Deputy Director of California Rural Legal Assistance 
 Denise Krepp (BA '95) – Chief Counsel for the United States Maritime Administration
 Neil Thomas Proto (MA '69) – General Counsel to President Jimmy Carter on Nuclear Safety, fellow of the Royal Geographical Society in London

Politics
 Kolinda Grabar-Kitarović (F.S. '03), current President of Croatia (2015–present)
 Chang Dae-whan (MA '74) – Prime Minister of South Korea
 Tammy Duckworth (MA '96) – U.S. Senator from Illinois
 Jeremiah Denton (MA '64) – U.S. Senator from Alabama
 Sam Johnson (MS '74) – U.S. Congressman from Texas
 Bob Barr (MA '72) – U.S. Congressman from Georgia
 Arifa Khalid Pervaiz – Congresswoman of the National Assembly of Pakistan
 Sara Gideon (BA '94) – Speaker of the House of Representatives of Maine
 K. T. McFarland (BA '73) – Deputy National Security Advisor
 Khatuna Kalmakhelidze (MA '07) – Minister of Corrections and Legal Assistance of the Republic of Georgia
 William Timmons – South Carolina State Senator
 Caroline Simmons – member of President Barack Obama's Transition Team
 Stephen Maitland – Pennsylvania State Representative
 David Crowley – Cincinnati, Ohio City Councilman and Vice-Mayor
 Linda Melconian – Massachusetts State Senator 
 Robert J. Winglass – Maine State Representative
 Jennifer Shasky Calvery – Director of the U.S. Treasury Department Financial Crimes Enforcement Network 
 Philip S. Smith – member of the Republican National Committee
 William Timmons – South Carolina State Senator

Economics
 Richard Carson – most-cited environmental economist in the world

Business
 Michael Punke – Vice President of Amazon Web Services, former U.S. Ambassador to the World Trade Organization
 Danny Sebright – President of the U.S.-U.A.E. Business Council, former Policy Director of the Office of the Secretary of Defense
 David A. Nadler – Vice-Chairman of Marsh & McLennan Companies

Military
 General John M. Shalikashvili (MA '70) – Supreme Allied Commander and Chairman of the Joint Chiefs of Staff
 General Fred K. Mahaffey – Four-Star U.S. Army General, Commander-in-Chief of U.S. Readiness Command
 General John T. Chain Jr. – U.S. Air Force General, Board of Directors member for Northrop Grumman and the Kemper Corporation
 General Frederick Kroesen – Commanding General of the Seventh United States Army
 General Thomas M. Ryan Jr. – U.S. Air Force General, Commander-in-Chief of Military Airlift Command
 General James P. Mullins – Four-Star U.S. Air Force General, Commander-in-Chief of Air Force Logistics Command
 General Donn A. Starry – Four-Star U.S. Army General, Commander-in-Chief of United States Strike Command
 General Bryce Poe II – Four-Star U.S. Air Force General, Commander of Air Force Logistics Command
 General Edwin H. Burba Jr. – Four-Star U.S. Army General, Commander-in-Chief of United States Army Forces Command
 Admiral Owen W. Siler (MA '68) – 15th Commandant of the U.S. Coast Guard
 Admiral John B. Hayes (MA '64) – 16th Commandant of the U.S. Cost Guard
 Admiral Sylvester R. Foley Jr. – Commander in Chief of the U.S. Pacific Fleet
 Admiral William O. Studeman – Deputy Director of the Central Intelligence Agency, Admiral of the United States Navy
 Vice Admiral Julien J. LeBourgeois – President of the Naval War College
 Rear Admiral Sumner Shapiro – Director of the Office of Naval Intelligence
 Rear Admiral Fran McKee – 1st female officer to hold the rank of rear admiral in the U.S. Navy, Alabama Women's Hall of Fame inductee
 Lincoln D. Faurer – Director of the National Security Agency
 Richard M. Wells – Director of the Defense Mapping Agency
 Mark M. Boatner III – Croix de Guerre-decorated soldier and military historian
 Hal Moore – Distinguished Service Cross and Order of Saint Maurice-decorated lieutenant general and military author
 Kenneth L. Tallman – 8th Superintendent of the United States Air Force Academy
 Shanti Sethi – 1st Indian-American woman to command a major U.S. Navy warship, the USS Decatur

International Organizations
 Rose Gottemoeller (MA '81) – 16th Deputy-General of the North Atlantic Treaty Organization (NATO)
 Ciarán Devane – Chief Executive of the British Council
 Olav Kjørven –  UNICEF Director for Public Partnerships, former Norwegian State Secretary for International Development
 Kathryne Bomberger – Director-General of the International Commission on Missing Persons
 Marc Garlasco – Senior Military Advisor for the Human Rights Council, Senior Civilian Protection Officer for the United Nations Assistance Mission in Afghanistan

Scholars
 Roderic Ai Camp (MA '67) – Mexico-United States relations specialist, New York Times, The Wall Street Journal, and BBC contributor, Woodrow Wilson International Center for Scholars Board of Directors member
 Ross Horning (MA, '52; Ph.D., '58) – historian
 Alireza Nader – RAND Corporation international policy analyst

Other
 Reona Ito – The American Prize-winning orchestral conductor
 F. Lynn McNulty – "Father" of U.S. Federal Information Security, Director of Information Security for the U.S. State Department
 W. W. Behrens Jr. – Founder of the National Oceanic and Atmospheric Administration
 Gorgi Popstefanov – 2016 and 2010 Macedonian National Men's Cycling Champion
 Sarah Reinertsen – ITU World Triathlon Championship-winning paratriathlete
 Charles C. Noble – Major General and engineer on the Manhattan Project

Faculty

Scholars & researchers
 Stephen C. Smith – current Director of the Institute for International Economic Policy
 Sabina Alkire – Director of the Oxford Poverty and Human Development Initiative
 David Shambaugh – Senior Fellow at the Brookings Institution
 Pavel Baev – Senior Fellow at the Brookings Institution
 Dina Rizk Khoury – Guggenheim Fellow
 Robert Entman – Humboldt Prize-winning communications scientist 
 Rouben Paul Adalian – Director of the Armenian National Institute
 Martha Finnemore – leader of the constructivist school of international relations theory
 Marc Lynch – Director of the Institute for Middle East Studies, Senior Fellow at the Center for a New American Security
 Harris Mylonas – Editor in Chief of Nationalities Papers
 Nathan J. Brown – former Director of the Institute for Middle East Studies, Board Advisor to the Project on Middle East Democracy
 Charles Glaser – famed Defensive Realist theorist
 Michael N. Barnett – famed Constructivist theorist
 Ronald H. Spector – Samuel Eliot Morison Prize-winning military historian
 Walter Reich – AAAS Award for Scientific Freedom and Responsibility-winning international relations scholar
 James Hershberg – former Director of the Cold War International History Project at the Woodrow Wilson Center
 Howard Sachar – National Jewish Book Award-winning Middle East historian

Diplomacy
 Stephen Biddle – Member of the Council on Foreign Relations
 Matthew Levinger – Senior Program Officer of the United States Institute of Peace
 Andrew A. Michta – Adjunct Fellow at the Center for Strategic and International Studies

Assistant Secretaries of State
 Thomas E. McNamara – former Assistant Secretary of State for Political-Military Affairs
 Eric Newsom – former Assistant Secretary of State for Political-Military Affairs
 Karl Inderfurth – former Assistant Secretary of State for South and Central Asian Affairs
 Esther Brimmer – former Assistant Secretary of State for International Organization Affairs
 Bathsheba Nell Crocker – former Assistant Secretary of State for International Organization Affairs
 George Moose – former Assistant Secretary of State for African Affairs
 Gaston J. Sigur Jr. – Assistant Secretary of State for East Asian and Pacific Affairs

U.S. Ambassadors
 David H. Shinn – former U.S. Ambassador to Ethiopia and Burkina Faso
 Edward "Skip" Gnehm – former U.S. Ambassador to Jordan, Kuwait and Australia
 Joseph LeBaron – former U.S. Ambassador to Qatar and Mauritania
 Ronald D. Palmer – former U.S. Ambassador to Togo, Malaysia, and Mauritius
 Thomas J. Dodd Jr. – former U.S. Ambassador to Costa Rica and Uruguay
 Lino Gutierrez – former U.S. Ambassador to Argentina and Nicaragua

Foreign Ambassadors
 Michael Oren – former Israeli Ambassador to the United States
 Farooq Sobhan – former Bangladeshi Ambassador to China, India, and Malaysia
 Arturo Sarukhan – former Mexican Ambassador to United States

Politicians
 Moudud Ahmed – former Prime Minister of Bangladesh
 S. M. Krishna – former Foreign Minister of India
 John Negroponte – former Director of National Intelligence, U.S. Deputy Secretary of State, U.S. Ambassador to the United Nations
 Robert O. Work – former U.S. Deputy Secretary of Defense
 Christopher A. Kojm – former Chairman of the National Intelligence Council
 Scott Pace – Chief Executive of the National Space Council
 Robert Hutchings – former Chairman of the National Intelligence Council
 Allison Macfarlane – former Chairwoman of the Nuclear Regulatory Commission
 Lawrence Wilkerson – former Chief of Staff to United States Secretary of State Colin Powell
 Leon Fuerth – former National Security Adviser to U.S. Vice President Al Gore
 Mickey Edwards – former U.S. Congressman from Oklahoma, Chairman of the House Republican Policy Committee

Economics
 James Foster – World Bank Board Advisor

Military
 William J. Crowe – former Chairman of the Joint Chiefs of Staff

Journalism
 Henry Farrell – Foreign Policy & Washington Post contributor
 Roy Richard Grinker – Editor of Anthropological Quarterly, New York Times and PBS NewsHour contributor
 David Alan Grier – Computer Magazine columnist
 Selig S. Harrison – Washington Post, New York Times, and The Financial Times-contributing journalist specializing in Southeast Asia

International Organizations
 Cynthia McClintock – Center for International Policy Board of Directors member, former President of the Latin American Studies Association
 Michael M. Cernea – World Bank Senior Advisor for Social Policy
 Nikolai Zlobin – President of the Center on Global Interests

Other
 Amitai Etzioni – former president of the American Sociological Association
 William Luers – former President of the Metropolitan Museum of Art
 James N Rosenau – former president of the International Studies Association
 Harry Harding – founding Dean of the Batten School of Leadership & Public Policy
 John Logsdon – former member of the NASA Advisory Council
 Pascale Ehrenfreund – CEO of the German Aerospace Center, first woman President of the Austrian Science Fund
 Ray O. Johnson – former Chief Technology Officer of Lockheed Martin

References

See also
List of George Washington University alumni
List of George Washington University faculty

Elliott School of International Affairs

Alumni by international affairs school in the United States